Heinz von Jaworsky (1912–1999) was a German cinematographer.

Selected filmography
 The Champion of Pontresina (1934)
 Miracle of Flight (1935)
 The Traitor (1936)
 D III 88 (1939)
 Quax the Crash Pilot (1941)
 Allez Hopp (1946)
 Spy for Germany (1956)

References

Bibliography
 Rainer Rother. Leni Riefenstahl: The Seduction of Genius. A&C Black, 2003.

External links

1912 births
1999 deaths
German cinematographers
Film people from Berlin